Layla was a first women's magazine published in Baghdad, Iraq, in 1923. It was published in the Arabic Language. The magazine which became the forerunner of the women's movement in Iraq ceased publication in 1925.

History
Layla was founded by Paulina Hassoun, a Jordanian woman migrated to Baghdad, in 1923 and focused exclusively on women's issues. It was published 20 issues from 15 October 1923 to 3 January 1925. It was closed due to financial reasons and protests from conservatives.

The magazine was a pioneer of its time and the next women's magazine was started only over a decade later. The magazine was started at time when the Iraqi women's movement itself started and the magazine was seen as a pioneer for raising women's issues including an editorial to the Iraqi Assembly to give women more rights in 1924.

References

External links

1923 establishments in Iraq
1925 disestablishments in Iraq
Arabic-language magazines
Defunct magazines published in Iraq
Magazines established in 1923
Magazines disestablished in 1925
Mass media in Baghdad
Monthly magazines
Women's magazines